The Minister for Energy was a position in the Luxembourgian cabinet from 15 July 1964 until 7 August 1999.  After the 1999 general election, the office was folded into the portfolio held by the Minister for the Economy.

List of Ministers for Energy

References
 

 
Energy, Minister for